The 2015 Lafayette Leopards football team represented Lafayette College in the 2015 NCAA Division I FCS football season. The Leopards were led by 16th year head coach Frank Tavani and played their home games at Fisher Stadium. They were a member of the Patriot League. They finished the season 1–10, 0–6 in Patriot League play to finish in last place.

Schedule

References

Lafayette
Lafayette Leopards football seasons
Lafayette Leopards football